The 1962 Spanish motorcycle Grand Prix was a FIM event held on 6 May 1962 at Montjuïc circuit. It was the first round of the 1962 Grand Prix motorcycle racing season and the 100th World Championship Grand Prix held since the championship began in 1949.

1962 Spanish Grand Prix 50cc final standings
12 laps

Number of finishers: 14

Fastest Lap Hans-Georg Anscheidt 2:15.83 =

1962 Spanish Grand Prix 125cc final standings
27 laps

Number of finishers: 10

Fastest Lap Luigi Taveri 2:01.68 =

1962 Spanish Grand Prix 250cc final standings
33 laps

Number of finishers: 7

Fastest Lap Tom Phillis 1:57.8 =

1962 Spanish Grand Prix Side-car final standings
27 laps

Number of finishers: 8

Fastest Lap Max Deubel / Emil Hörner 2:03.82 =

References
 Büla, Maurice & Schertenleib, Jean-Claude (2001). Continental Circus 1949-2000. Chronosports S.A. 

Spanish motorcycle Grand Prix
Spain
Motorcycle Grand Prix